Moosa Al Halyan (born 1969) is an Emirati surrealist painter from Dubai, United Arab Emirates and a member of the Emirates Fine Arts Society.

In 1984 when Moosa Al Halyan was 16, Moosa decided to share his work and participate in exhibitions. Moosa Al Halyan chose always chooses to draw the horse because he believes that when he chooses to draw an animal, rather than the human himself, you can escape issues of discrimination and racism.

Exhibitions 
 1984 Al Banoosh 2nd Exhibition, Al Wasl Club, Dubai. 
 1990 The 6th GCC Youth Exhibition, Abu Dhabi, UAE
 1984,86,87,88,1990 The annual exhibitions of the Emirates Fine Arts Society
 1995 Sharjah Biennial, Sharjah, UAE  
 1997 Sharjah Biennial, Sharjah, UAE
 1996 Bangladesh Biennial 2015 The UAE Pavilion, Venice Biennial, Italy

Awards 
 2012 EWA award in recognizing excellence in Innovation
 2013 Dubai Government’s Excellence Programme.

See also 

List of Emirati artists

References 

Emirati contemporary artists
Emirati surrealist artists
Surrealist artists
Emirati painters
1969 births
Living people